The siege of Lüshun was a military conflict between the Later Jin and Ming dynasty. In the summer of 1634 the Jin attacked and conquered the port city of Lüshun from Ming.

Background

The city of Lüshun had been briefly taken once before by the Jin in 1622, but was retaken soon after.

In the spring of 1633 the ex-Ming commanders Kong Youde and Geng Zhongming defected to the Jin after their rebellion was suppressed by Ming forces. They offered their expertise in naval warfare to take Lüshun.

Course of battle

In the summer of 1634 a Jin army attacked Lüshun. After six days the Jin had lost 4,000 men and were still unable to take the city. However the garrison was suffering from dwindling ammunition. Seeing that defeat was imminent, its commander Huang Long sent a messenger with his seals of office back to Beijing.

The Jin attacked from both sea and land on the seventh day. Although the Ming managed to fend off the naval invasion, the land assault managed to take the walls and brought the fight into the city. Huang and the city garrisons fought until they were surrounded, at which point Huang committed suicide and all his troops were butchered. In total, 5,000 Ming soldiers died in the siege.

Aftermath

The Jin left 2,500 men to garrison Lüshun and it was used as the base of operations for mopping up Ming remnants in the Bohai Sea.

References

Bibliography

 .

 (alk. paper) 
 

 

 .

 

 
  (paperback).
 
 
 

 
 .
 .

 
 
 

 

 
 
 
 

 

 

 .

 

 
 .
  
 

 
 

1633 in China
Lüshun
Lüshun
Lüshun